The Tainan Municipal Baseball Stadium is a baseball stadium in South District,
Tainan, Taiwan. Situated in the South District, it is currently used mostly for professional baseball games, and has been the home stadium of Uni-President Lions since 1990.

History 
The stadium was built in 1931 at the site of a baseball field built during the Japanese period. The stadium underwent a series of refurbishment in the 70's, and the light poles were installed in 1992 to enable the stadium for nighttime uses. Because the stadium is directly under the flight path of commercial airliners in and out of Tainan Airport, the light poles had their height reduced and had to be placed in front of the grandstands, obscuring the view of certain sections and also make the ball hard to see for outfielders.

The stadium is currently under the management of the Uni-President 7-Eleven Lions organization since 1999, although the ownership is retained by the Tainan City Government. Chiayi-Tainan Luka of Taiwan Major League also occasionally played its home games here during its year of existence, although never officially naming it its home stadium.

See also
 Uni-President Lions
 Chinese Professional Baseball League
 List of stadiums in Taiwan
 Sport in Taiwan

References

1931 establishments in Taiwan
Baseball venues in Taiwan
Buildings and structures in Tainan
Sport in Tainan
Sports venues completed in 1931
Multi-purpose stadiums in Taiwan